Sir Watkin Lewes (1740 – 13 July 1821) was a Welsh politician in England.

Lewes was the second son of Reverend Watkin Lewes, of Pen-y-Benglog, Melinau, and Ann Williams, of Treamlod (Ambleston), Pembrokeshire. He was educated at Shrewsbury School and at Magdalene College, Cambridge, from which he graduated in 1763. He was elected alderman for the London ward of Lime Street and Sheriff of London in 1772, and was knighted in 1773. In 1780 he was elected Lord Mayor of London.

In October 1781 he was elected at a by-election as one of the four Members of Parliament (MPs) for the City of London He served as an MP until his defeat at the 1796 general election. He stood again at the general election, in 1802, but was unsuccessful.

He took a keen interest in the history and literature of Wales and was elected the second president (Llywydd) of the Honourable Society of Cymmrodorion.

He died in a coffeehouse on Ludgate Hill, which was situated within the boundaries of the Fleet Prison where he had been imprisoned for debt.

References

External links
 

1740 births
1821 deaths
People educated at Shrewsbury School
Alumni of Magdalene College, Cambridge
Sheriffs of the City of London
18th-century lord mayors of London
18th-century English politicians
Inmates of Fleet Prison
People imprisoned for debt
Members of the Parliament of Great Britain for English constituencies
British MPs 1780–1784
British MPs 1784–1790
British MPs 1790–1796